Miller v. National Broadcasting Co.  (1986) is a US tort law case on negligent infliction of emotional distress.

Background
On October 30, 1979 an NBC camera crew was following a group of Los Angeles Fire Department firefighters and paramedics. A call came in about a man having a heart attack. The camera crew and the paramedics rushed to the home of Brownie and Dave Miller. The camera crew, without consent from anyone, rushed into the house with the paramedics and taped footage of Mr. Dave Miller having what would be a fatal heart attack. The crew later that night would put the footage on the air, also without consent. Brownie Miller filed suit against NBC, Ruben Norte (a producer for NBC) and the city of Los Angeles for trespass, invasion of privacy and infliction of emotional distress.

Decision
The Court of Appeals ruled ultimately in favor of the plaintiff, reversing the District Court's summary judgement. In an opinion written by Justice Lloyd Hanson, the court determined that the media does not have the same access privileges to a private property as emergency responders, even if the media obtained consent to follow the emergency responders. Hanson wrote, "One seeking emergency medical attention does not thereby "open the door" for persons without any clearly identifiable and justifiable official reason who may wish to enter the premises where the medical aid is being administered…the clear line of demarcation between the public interest served by public officials and that served by private business must not be obscured."

Notes

References

External links

United States tort case law
1986 in United States case law
National Broadcasting Company
California state case law
1986 in California